Air Marshal Sir Simon John Bollom,  (born 1960) is a retired senior Royal Air Force (RAF) officer who is currently serving as Chief Executive Officer of Defence Equipment and Support.

RAF career
Educated at the University of Southampton, Bollom joined the RAF as an engineer in 1981. He became Director, Tactical Mobility at the Ministry of Defence in November 2000, Director Tornado Future Support at the Ministry of Defence in January 2003 and Tornado Integrated Project Team Leader in March 2005. He went on to be Director of Combat Air at Defence Equipment and Support in January 2008 and then Chief of Materiel – Air at Defence Equipment and Support in October 2012. He left the Royal Air Force in April 2016.

He was appointed Companion of the Order of the Bath (CB) in the 2011 Birthday Honours. In 2013, he was elected a Fellow of the Royal Academy of Engineering (FREng). He was appointed Knight Commander of the Order of the British Empire (KBE) in the 2016 New Year Honours.

Post-RAF Career

In May 2017 he became the interim Chief of Materiel (Ships) at Defence Equipment and Support following the appointment of Vice Admiral Sir Simon Lister as acting CEO of the  Submarine Delivery Agency. He became Chief Executive Officer of Defence Equipment and Support in May 2018. In 2021, he was paid a salary of £275,000 to £280,000 and a bonus of £95,000 to £100,000.

References

|-

1960 births
Alumni of the University of Southampton
British military personnel of The Troubles (Northern Ireland)
Companions of the Order of the Bath
Knights Commander of the Order of the British Empire
Living people
Royal Air Force air marshals